Francesca Tu (born 1943) is a Chinese-born German film and television actress.

Selected filmography

Film
 The Face of Fu Manchu (1965)
 The Brides of Fu Manchu (1966)
 You Only Live Twice (1967)
 Lotus Flowers for Miss Quon (1967)
 Diamonds for Breakfast (1968)
 Don't Raise the Bridge, Lower the River (1968)
 The Blood of Fu Manchu (1968)
 Salt and Pepper (1968)
 The Chairman (1969)
 Liebling, sei nicht albern! (1970)
 Welcome to the Club (1971)
 The Hunting Party (1971)

Television
 Danger Man (1965, 1 episode)
 Take a Pair of Private Eyes (1966, 1 episode)
 Callan (1967) (A Magnum for Schneider)
 Hugh and I Spy  (1968, 1 episode)
 Department S (1969, 1 episode)
 The Troubleshooters (1969, 1 episode)
 Jason King (1972, 1 episode)
 Tatort (1973, 1 episode)

References

Bibliography 
 Peter Shelley. Gene Hackman: The Life and Work. McFarland, 2018.

External links 
 

1943 births
Living people
German film actresses
Chinese film actresses
German television actresses
Chinese television actresses
People from Wenzhou